Julieum 4 Perum is a 2017 Indian Tamil-language comedy drama film written and directed by R. V. Satheesh. The film features Amudhavanan, Alya Manasa, George Vijay, R. V. Satheesh and Yoganand in the lead roles, while Mahanadi Shankar  amongst others plays a supporting role. The film began production during early 2016 and was released on 7 April 2017.

Cast

 Julie as Julie
 Harsha Raj
 Alya Manasa as Manisha
 Amudhavanan
 George Vijay
 R. V. Satheesh
 Yoganand
 Reena
 Mahanadi Shankar as Ediyamen
 Youdish Shivan
 Jaguar Thangam
 Billy Muralee
 Ghilli Maran
 Homaay
Vengal Rao as Police officer
Baby Dhaksini
 Krishna Kumar
Sivaranjini
 S. Kamal Kumar
Sandy as Dimple Raj
 Durai Sudhakar as Unmai Selvan

Production
R. V. Satheesh left his corporate job in the USA to attempt to make it as a film maker in Tamil cinema and trained under R. Parthiepan. The director revealed that the film would revolve around a "dog napping" and would focus on the situational comedy of the incident, with his dog named Lucky playing a pivotal role. The idea for the film was based upon the widespread dog-napping which hard occurred in California during 2014. Television actor Amudhavanan was selected to play a leading role, while George Vijay, previously seen in Mani Ratnam's Kadal (2013) and Balaji Mohan's Maari (2015), was also picked for a lead role.

Soundtrack

The film's music was composed by Raghu Sravan Kumar, while the audio rights of the film was acquired by Trend Music South. The album released on 5 September 2016 and featured five songs.

Release
The film opened on 7 April 2017 across Tamil Nadu alongside Mani Ratnam's Kaatru Veliyidai. The Times of India wrote "right from the writing to the filmmaking, this film has amateurishness written all over it" and that "every scene is so silly, infantile and preposterous (all in a bad way) that we keep wondering how someone felt that this could be a movie". A critic from The New Indian Express wrote "a small budgeted film, the production values are low and this is evident throughout" but added  it is "mildly amusing, what the film needed was a screenplay that had more punch and fizz in it" and "at the most, Julieum… is a promising effort by a debutant maker".

References

External links
 

2017 films
2010s Tamil-language films
Indian comedy films
Films about dogs
2017 directorial debut films
2017 comedy films